Paul Herbert Goldstein (born August 4, 1976) is a retired tennis player from the United States, who turned professional in 1998. He announced his retirement from professional tennis in February 2008, as he was starting working with a clean energy company.

As a junior, he won the USTA Boys' 16s National Championship in 1992, and the USTA Boys' 18s National Championships in both 1993 and 1994. He then played college tennis at Stanford University, from which he graduated after a career in which he was named an All-American each of the four years he played, and the team won the national championship each year. He won the gold medal in singles at the 1999 Pan American Games.

The right-hander reached career-high ATP Tour rankings of World No. 58 in singles in April 2006, and World No. 40 in doubles in February 2007. He is now head coach of the Stanford Men's tennis team.

Early life
Goldstein was born Washington DC and raised in Rockville, Maryland, and is Jewish. He is the son of Clark Goldstein, a former national table tennis champion. He started playing when he was nine.

He won the USTA Boys' 16s National Championship in 1992, and the USTA Boys' 18s National Championships in both 1993 and 1994 (in 1994, defeating Jan-Michael Gambill). He also won the 1994 doubles championship with Scott Humphries.

He is a 1994 graduate of Sidwell Friends School in Washington, D.C., where he was a four-time Washington Post First Team All Met selection ('91–'94).

College career
Goldstein played college tennis at Stanford University and graduated in 1998 with a degree in human biology.  He was an All-American each year, and the team won the national championship each year. In his senior year he was Pac-10 Player of the Year in 1998, after a 33–2 season in which he was team captain.

Pan American Games
Goldstein won the gold medal in singles at the 1999 Pan American Games defeating Cecil Mamiit.

Pro career
He had 26 USTA titles through November 2005.Paul Goldstein: Circuit Player of the Week

In January 1999 at the Australian Open he shocked world # 8 Greg Rusedski, 6–4, 6–7(11,) 7–6(5), 6–2.  In June at Wimbledon he upset both world # 33 Jan Siemerink, 6–4, 5–7, 4–6, 6–2, 6–1, and # 17 Félix Mantilla, 6–2, 6–4, 6–7(5), 6–2.  In August he upset world # 8 Àlex Corretja of Spain 7–6(11), 7–6(5), in Washington, D.C..

In February 2000 he defeated world # 17 Pat Rafter of Australia 4–6, 6–1, 6–2, in Delray Beach, Florida.

In the 2005 US Open, Goldstein and Jim Thomas upset defending champions and #1 seeds Mark Knowles and Daniel Nestor in the first round, as well as Simon Aspelin and Todd Perry in the QFs, before losing to eventual champions Bob Bryan and Mike Bryan in the SFs.  In the 2006 US Open, Goldstein and Thomas again defeated Knowles and Nestor (this time in the 3rd round).

Goldstein and Jim Thomas lost in the doubles finals of the 2006 SAP Open to 47-year-old John McEnroe and Jonas Björkman.  They also were doubles finalists in two other ATP tournaments in 2006 (Indianapolis, won by Andy Roddick and Bobby Reynolds, and Tokyo, won by Ashley Fisher and Tripp Phillips).

In February 2006 he beat world # 18 Robby Ginepri 6–7(4), 6–3, 6–1, in Las Vegas, and in July he defeated world # 13 Lleyton Hewitt 6–4, 6–4 in Los Angeles.  In the January Australian Open, he beat future champion Novak Djokovic in the first round 6–2, 1–6, 6–3, 6–2.  Paul was easily defeated in the next round by Tommy Haas 0–6, 1–6, 2–6.  Haas lost to Federer in 5 sets in the fourth round.

In January 2007 he defeated world # 21 Dominik Hrbatý of Slovakia 6–2, 7–6(4), in Adelaide, Australia.  The next month he defeated world # 45 Julien Benneteau in Las Vegas, 6–1, 6–0.  Despite losing in the first round of singles at the Tunica Resorts Challenger in May, he and Donald Young won the doubles final, defeating Pablo Cuevas and Horacio Zeballos 4–6, 6–1, 10–4.

Tennis exhibitions
Goldstein has participated in exhibition events for other tennis players and their charities, including Andy Roddick, Jim Thomas, and the Bryan brothers.  On September 27, 2008, he participated in The Bryan Brothers' All-Star Tennis Smash in Thousand Oaks, California, initially playing doubles with Justin Gimblestob, and ending up playing singles with Andre Agassi (losing 7–5).

Post-retirement
Goldstein officially retired in February 2008 and began working with a clean energy company in the San Francisco Bay area. In 2004 he married his college sweetheart and partner of nine years, Abbie; it was she who persuaded him to play on during the 2007 season. They live in Menlo Park, California, with their three children.

In 2014, Goldstein became head coach of the Stanford Men's Tennis Team.

Halls of Fame
Goldstein was inducted into the ITA Collegiate Tennis Hall of Fame in 2013.

Goldstein was inducted into the North California Jewish Sports Hall of Fame in 2015.

ATP career finals

Doubles: 5 (5 runner-ups)

ATP Challenger and ITF Futures finals

Singles: 20 (13–7)

Doubles: 20 (12–8)

Junior Grand Slam finals

Doubles: 1 (1 runner-up)

Performance timelines

Singles

Doubles

See also
 List of select Jewish tennis players

References

External links

Goldstein World Ranking History
Jewish Virtual Library bio
Jews in Sports bio
"Paul Goldstein: Circuit Player of the Week", 11/9/05
Jim Thomas (Goldstein's doubles partner) official website
Goldstein participating in 2008 tennis exhibition event

1976 births
Living people
American male tennis players
Stanford Cardinal men's tennis players
Tennis players from San Francisco
Tennis players from Washington, D.C.
Tennis players at the 1999 Pan American Games
Jewish American sportspeople
Jewish tennis players
Pan American Games gold medalists for the United States
Pan American Games medalists in tennis
Universiade medalists in tennis
Universiade gold medalists for the United States
Medalists at the 1999 Pan American Games
21st-century American Jews